Hariharananda Giri (27 May 1907 – 3 December 2002), was an Indian yogi and guru who taught in India as well as in western countries.  He was born Rabindranath Bhattacharya in Nadia district, West Bengal.  He was the head of the Kriya Yoga Institute, United States, and founder worldwide Kriya Yoga Centers. According to some sources, Hariharananda was a direct disciple of Yukteswar Giri.

Early life 

Hariharananda Giri, affectionately known as "Baba" to his students, was known as a Kriya Yogi in the lineage of Mahavatar Babaji, Lahiri Mahasaya, Yukteswar Giri, and Paramahansa Yogananda.

In 1932, Rabi went to meet the Kriya master, Yukteshwar Giri, who initiated him into Kriya Yoga, in his Serampore ashram, West Bengal. Yukteshwar Giri taught him cosmic astrology, and entreated him to come and live in his Karar Ashram at Puri, in Odisha.

In 1935, he met Paramahansa Yogananda, and received the second Kriya initiation from him. In 1938, he renounced the material life and entered his guru's ashram in Puri, starting the life of an ascetic monk as Brahmachari Rabinarayan.

He received the third Kriya initiation from Swami Satyananda Giri in 1941, the head of Karar Ashram and childhood friend of Paramahansa Yogananda.

Career 
Hariharananda grew to prominence and eventually traveled outside of India with visits to Europe in 1974, South America and North America in 1975 and a return visit to the U.S. in 1977.

Hariharananda resided at the ashram he founded at Homestead, Florida (another international headquarters is in Orissa, India), for several years prior to his death in Miami in December 2002 and was buried at Balighai, in Orissa, that same month.

Books

References

Further reading

External links

Hariharananda Giri at Kriya Yoga Institute website.
Karar Ashram Puri
Kriya Yoga Mission 

1907 births
2002 deaths
20th-century Bengalis
Bengali Hindus
Bengali writers
20th-century monks
20th-century Hindu religious leaders
Hindu revivalist writers
Bengali Hindu saints
Indian spiritual writers
Indian Hindu missionaries
Indian Hindu monks
Indian yoga teachers
Kriya yogis
People from Nadia district
Indian religious writers
Indian yoga gurus